The 2012–13 UNAM season was the 66th professional season of Mexico's top-flight football league. The season is split into two tournaments—the Torneo Apertura and the Torneo Clausura—each with identical formats and each contested by the same eighteen teams. UNAM began their season on July 21, 2012 against Atlas, UNAM played their homes games on Sundays at noon local time. UNAM did not reach the final phase in the Apertura tournament and were eliminated by América in the quarter-finals of the final phase in the Clausura tournament.

Tornero Apertura

Squad

Regular season

Apertura 2012 results

Goalscorers

Results

Results summary

Results by round

Apertura 2012 Copa MX

Group stage

Apertura results

Goalscorers

Results

Results by round

Tornero Clausura

Squad

Regular season

Clausura 2013 results

Final phase

América advanced 3–1 on aggregate

Goalscorers

Regular season

Source:

Final phase

Results

Results summary

Results by round

Clausura 2013 Copa MX

Group stage

Apertura results

Goalscorers

Results

Results by round

References

Mexican football clubs 2012–13 season
Club Universidad Nacional seasons